Marquez crater is a meteorite crater located in Leon County, Texas near the small town of Marquez about  northeast of Austin, Texas, United States.

The crater is not exposed at the surface, but some surface formations including the Marquez Dome are thought to be exposed portions of the rebound peak.

See also
Odessa Meteor Crater
Sierra Madera crater

References

Impact craters of the United States
Landforms of Leon County, Texas
Paleocene impact craters